Gonville and Caius College, often referred to simply as Caius, is a constituent college of the University of Cambridge in Cambridge, England. Founded in 1348 by Edmund Gonville, it is the fourth-oldest of the University of Cambridge's 31 colleges and one of the wealthiest.  In 1557, it was refounded by alumnus John Caius. The college has been attended by many students who have gone on to significant accomplishment, including fifteen Nobel Prize winners, the second-highest of any Oxbridge college after Trinity College, Cambridge.

The college has long associations with the teaching of medicine, especially due to its prominent alumni in the medical profession. It also has globally-recognized and prestigious academic programmes in law, economics, English literature, and history. Famous Gonville and Caius alumni include physicians John Caius (who gave the college the caduceus in its insignia) and William Harvey. Other alumni in the sciences include Francis Crick (joint discoverer of the structure of DNA with James Watson), James Chadwick (discoverer of the neutron), and Howard Florey (developer of penicillin). Stephen Hawking, previously Cambridge's Lucasian Chair of Mathematics Emeritus, was a fellow of the college from 1965 until his death in 2018. Other notable alumni include John Venn (inventor of the Venn diagram), former Chancellor of the Exchequer and Father of the House of Commons Kenneth Clarke, comedian and Channel 4 television presenter Jimmy Carr, and former Downing Street director of communications Alastair Campbell.

Several streets in the city, including Harvey Road, Glisson Road, and Gresham Road, are named after Gonville and Caius alumni. The college and its masters have been influential in the development of the university, including in the founding of other colleges, including Trinity Hall and Darwin College and providing land on Sidgwick Site on which Faculty of Law was built.

History 

The college was founded in 1348 as Gonville Hall by Edmund Gonville, a clergyman who hailed from a gentry family of French origin. Gonville held various positions in the English Church, serving as Rector of three parishes, Thelnetham (1320–26), Rushford, Norfolk (1326-1342), and Terrington St Clement (1343-1351). Such occupations afforded him sufficient wealth that he was able to lend money to Edward III, an act that saw him appointed a King's Clerk.

With the support of Sir Walter Manny, Gonville petitioned the king for permission to found a college at Cambridge consisting of 20 scholars. In January 1348, Edward III granted this request and issued Letters patent. Its 1348 founding makes Gonville and Caius the fourth-oldest surviving college at Cambridge.

Gonville died three years later, in 1351, and left behind an institution that begun to struggle financially. William Bateman, Bishop of Norwich, intervened and moved the college to its current location off Trinity Street in central Cambridge. He also leased himself land close to River Cam to set up his own college, Trinity Hall. Gonville Hall was renamed The Hall of the Annunciation of the Blessed Virgin Mary and Bateman appointed his former chaplain John Colton, who was later made Archbishop of Armagh, as the college's master.

By the sixteenth century, the college had fallen into disrepair. In 1557, it was refounded by Royal Charter as Gonville and Caius College by alumnus John Caius. Caius had read divinity at the college between 1529 and 1533 and later travelled to Renaissance Italy, where he studied medicine at the University of Padua under Montanus and Vesalius. Following his return to England, Caius had become a renowned physician and served many terms as president of the Royal College of Physicians. At the time of the college's re-founding, he had worked as physician to two English monarchs, Edward VI and Mary I, and later served in the same capacity for Elizabeth I.

Following the death of Thomas Bacon, Caius was appointed master of the college on 24 January 1559, a position he held until shortly before his death in 1573. He provided the college with significant funds and greatly expanded the college's buildings. Caius accepted no payment for his services but insisted on several rules, including that the college admit no scholar who "is deformed, dumb, blind, lame, maimed, mutilated, a Welshman, or suffering from any grave or contagious illness, or an invalid, that is sick in a serious measure". Caius also built a three-sided court, Caius Court, "lest the air from being confined within a narrow space should become foul". Caius was responsible for developing the college's strong global reputation in medicine, which continues to this day.

By 1630, the college had expanded greatly with roughly 25 fellows and 150 students. But the number of fellows and strudents fell in the following century, returning to the 1630 level only in the early nineteenth century. Since then, Gonville and Caius has grown considerably, and it has now one of the University of Cambridge's largest undergraduate populations. In 1979, the college first admitted women as fellows and students. It now has over 110 Fellows, over 700 students and about 200 staff.

Gonville and Caius is one of the wealthiest of all Cambridge colleges with an endowment of £221 million in 2018.

The college's present 43rd Master, appointed in 2018, is Pippa Rogerson.

Buildings and grounds

Old Courts 

The first buildings erected on the college's current site date from 1353 when Bateman built Gonville Court. The college chapel was added in 1393 with the Old Hall (used until recently as a library); Master's Lodge followed in the next half century. Most of the stone used to build the college came from Ramsey Abbey near Ramsey, Cambridgeshire. Gonville and Caius has the oldest purpose-built college chapel in continuous use in either Oxford or Cambridge. The chapel is situated centrally within the college, reflecting the college's religious foundation.

On the re-foundation by Caius, the college was expanded and updated. In 1565, the building of Caius Court began, and Caius planted an avenue of trees in what is now known as Tree Court. He was also responsible for building the college's three gates, symbolising the path of academic life. On matriculation, graduates arrive at the Gate of Humility, near the Porters' Lodge in the centre of the campus, and then pass through the Gate of Honour to the neighbouring Senate House, where they receive their degrees. The Gate of Honour is only used for special occasions, including graduation. Students of Gonville and Caius commonly refer to the fourth gate in the college, between Tree Court and Gonville Court, which also gives access to some lavatories, as the Gate of Necessity.

The buildings of Gonville Court were given classical facades in the 1750s. The Old Library and Hall were designed by Anthony Salvin in 1854. On the wall of the Hall hangs a college flag, which in 1912 was flown at the South Pole by Cambridge's Edward Wilson during the Terra Nova Expedition of 1910–1913. Gonville Court, though remodelled in the 18th and 19th centuries, is the oldest part of the college. Newrt lecture rooms were designed by Alfred Waterhouse and completed by Rattee and Kett in 1884.

West Road site 
Caius owns a substantial amount of land between West Road and Sidgwick Avenue. Set in landscaped gardens, the modern Harvey Court (named after William Harvey and designed by Leslie Martin) was built on West Road in 1961. Adjacent to Harvey Court is the Stephen Hawking Building, which opened its doors to first-year undergraduates in October 2006. The Stephen Hawking Building provides suite accommodations for 75 students and eight fellows and conference facilities. It boasts some of the highest-standard student accommodation in Cambridge.

Additional buildings provide housing for older students, a day care, and various study and music rooms. The college also owns extensive gardens and the land on which the adjacent Squire Law Library has stood since 1995.

Libraries 

Caius has one of the largest libraries in Oxbridge, housed in the Cockerell Building. Caius acquired the lease on the building, which previously housed the Seeley History Library and the Squire Law Library, in the 1990s. The college library was relocated there from Gonville Court in the summer of 1996, following an extensive renovation.

Other courts and college accommodations

Across Trinity Street on land surrounding St Michael's Church. St Michael's Court was completed in the 1930s; on the south side of St Michael's Court is new campus building that overlooks Market Place. The college also owns several houses around Cambridge, on Mortimer Road and Gresham Road, where some second year undergraduates live, and on Harvey Road and St Paul's Road, which are occupied by graduate students.

Grounds 
The Fellows' garden lies just beyond Harvey Court, on Sidgwick Avenue. The extensive sports fields are located on Barton Road, a short walk from Harvey Court.

Traditions 

Gonville and Caius College maintains many traditions. It offers two seatings in Hall three nights a week. Typically attended by between 150–200 students, Hall consists of a three-course meal served after 18:00 (First Hall) or 19:15 (Formal Hall); Formal Hall requires a gown be worn, and seats Fellows at its high table. It is preceded by the benediction, which is said in Latin:

Benedic, Domine, nobis et donis tuis quae ex largitate tua sumus sumpturi; et concede ut, ab iis salubriter enutriti, tibi debitum obsequium praestare valeamus, per Jesum Christum dominum nostrum; mensae caelestis nos participes facias, Rex aeternae gloriae.

As at most Oxbridge colleges, it is tradition that only the Fellows may walk on the grass.

The college also enforces the system of exeats or official permissions to leave the college. Students wishing to be absent from college overnight during term time must obtain leave to do so from their tutors, and terminal exeats must be obtained before the end of term.

Student life 

Caius Boat Club is the college's boat club, with the men's 1st VIII remaining unbeaten in the seasons of 2010/11 and of 2011/2012, and is currently in possession of the May Bumps headship (as well as second place in the Lent bumps, behind LMBC).

Caius Jazz takes place most terms in the college bar, inviting 'some of the most illustrious names in the contemporary scene' and a house band of students studying at London conservatoires to play in the college bar. In recent years Steve Fishwick, Sam Mayne, Ian Shaw, Barry Green, Gareth Lockrane, and Paul Jarvis have all been featured.

The Caius May Ball is an all-night party in June, held every two years.

Squires is an all-male drinking society; although it is not officially affiliated with the college, all of its members are Caians. They hold an annual garden party to kick off May Week. The female equivalent is called Cupids.

Choir 

The Gonville and Caius Choir was founded by composer Charles Wood in the late 19th century. It was most recently directed by the college's scholar of South American choral music Geoffrey Webber until his 2019 resignation. The choir tours abroad and records eclectically. The choir is made up from scholars and exhibitioners from the college, and a few volunteers from other Cambridge colleges.

JCR
The college's union is Gonville and Caius Student Union (GCSU). Natalia Emsley is the 2022-23 president.

Notable alumni

Since its founding, Gonville and Caius has graduated accomplished and famed individuals across most fields, including 15 Nobel Prize laureates:

Nobel Prize laureates

 1932 Charles Scott Sherrington – neurophysiologist (student and fellow)
 1935 James Chadwick – physicist, discoverer of the neutron (PhD student, fellow and master)
 1945 Howard Florey – co-developer of penicillin (PhD student and fellow).
 1954 Max Born – physicist (researcher)
 1962 Francis Crick – discovered DNA's structure (PhD student and honorary fellow)
 1972 John Hicks – economist (fellow)
 1974 Antony Hewish – astronomer (student and fellow)
 1976 Milton Friedman – economist (visiting fellow)
 1977 Nevill Francis Mott – theoretical physicist (fellow and master)
 1984 Richard Stone – economist (student)
 2001 Joseph Stiglitz – economist (fellow)
 2008 Roger Tsien – chemist (fellow)
 2013 Michael Levitt – chemist (research fellow)
 2016 Michael Kosterlitz – physicist (student)
 2019 Peter J. Ratcliffe – physician-scientist (student)

Notable fellows and masters

Notable organ scholars
Heathcote Dicken Statham (1908–1911)

Burials
 John Caius
 Thomas Legge
 Stephen Perse

Gallery

See also 
 Caius Boat Club
 Gonville & Caius Association Football Club
 John of Padua
 List of organ scholars

References

Bibliography 
 Brooke, C. A history of Gonville and Caius College. Woodbridge, Suffolk: Boydell, 1985 (corrected reprint, 1996). .

External links 

Gonville and Caius College Choir

 
1348 establishments in England
1557 establishments in England
Alfred Waterhouse buildings
Colleges of the University of Cambridge
Grade I listed buildings in Cambridge
Grade I listed educational buildings
Organisations based in Cambridge with royal patronage